The 2017–18 Latvian Basketball League was the 27th and last season of the top basketball league of Latvia. VEF Rīga was the defending champions. Eventually, Rīga lost the final to Ventspils by 2–4.

Competition format
The same ten teams from the previous season will join the league. The two first qualified teams will join directly the semifinals while teams between third and sixth will qualify to the quarterfinals.

Teams

Barons withdrew from the competition.

Regular season

Table

Playoffs
The playoffs were played with a best-of-five games format, except for the finals, that were played in seven games. Seeded teams played games 1, 3 and 5 at home, except in the finals where the seeded team played at home games 1, 2, 5 and 7.

References

External links
Latvian Basketball Federation

Latvijas Basketbola līga
Latvian